Väröbacka is a locality situated in Varberg Municipality, Halland County, Sweden, with 630 inhabitants in 2010. Sunvära SK is a bandy club.

References 

Populated places in Varberg Municipality